Jon Philip Lane (born 17 August 1949) is a British ice dancing coach and former competitor. With Janet Sawbridge, he is the 1968 World bronze medalist and a two-time European medalist (silver in 1969, bronze in 1968).

Lane emigrated to Canada with his wife, Carol. They coach ice dancing together in Scarborough, Toronto, Ontario. Their past and present students include:
 Mackenzie Bent / Garrett MacKeen
 Vanessa Crone / Paul Poirier
 Piper Gilles / Paul Poirier
 Kharis Ralph / Asher Hill
 Olivia Nicole Martins / Alvin Chau
 Carolane Soucisse / Shane Firus

Competitive highlights 
With Janet Sawbridge

References

British emigrants to Canada
British male ice dancers
1949 births
European Figure Skating Championships medalists
British figure skating coaches
Living people
World Figure Skating Championships medalists